The Lovemaster is a 1997 American comedy film directed by Michael Goldberg and starring Craig Shoemaker, Courtney Thorne-Smith, George Wendt and Richard Singer.

Plot
A stand-up comic performs at a comedy club and rants about his personal life and discusses, via fantasy flashbacks, his many personalities and anxieties.

Cast
 George Wendt as the therapist
 Craig Shoemaker as Craig

References

External links 

1997 films
1997 comedy films
American comedy films
Films set in the 1990s
1990s English-language films
1990s American films